Richard Sims Donkin (27 August 1836 –  5 February 1919) was an English shipowner and Conservative politician who sat in the House of Commons from 1885 to 1900.

Donkin was born in Tynemouth, the son of James Donkin of North Shields and his wife Ann Sims. He married Hannah Dryden in Christ Church, Tynemouth in 1864. He became a partner in Nelson, Donkin & Co steamship-owners of Newcastle on Tyne. He was a member of the  committee of Lloyd's Register of Shipping and was a J.P. for Northumberland.

In the 1885 general election, Donkin was elected Member of Parliament (MP) for the newly created constituency of Tynemouth. He held the seat until he stood down at the 1900 general election.

Donkin lived at Albemarle, Wimbledon Common and died at the age of 82. The National Portrait Gallery has a photograph of him, which is available on-line.

References

External links 

 

1836 births
1919 deaths
British businesspeople in shipping
Conservative Party (UK) MPs for English constituencies
UK MPs 1885–1886
UK MPs 1886–1892
UK MPs 1892–1895
UK MPs 1895–1900
People from Tynemouth
Politicians from Tyne and Wear
19th-century British businesspeople